Arhopala madytus, the bright oakblue, is a butterfly of the family Lycaenidae. The species was first described by Hans Fruhstorfer in 1914. It is found on New Guinea and adjacent islands (Aru, Ambon, Waigeu, from Western New Guinea to Papua, Woodlark and the Louisiades) and the north-east coast of Queensland, Australia.

The wingspan is about 40 mm.

The larvae feed on Terminalia catappa, T. melanocarpa, T. sericocarpa and Hibiscus tiliaceus. They are attended by the ant species Oecophylla smaragdina.

References

Arhopala
Butterflies of Oceania
Butterflies of Australia
Butterflies of Indonesia
Taxa named by Hans Fruhstorfer
Butterflies described in 1914